May is the name of several rural localities in Russia:
May, Dubrovsky District, Bryansk Oblast, a village in Peklinsky Rural Administrative Okrug of Dubrovsky District in Bryansk Oblast; 
May, Klimovsky District, Bryansk Oblast, a settlement in Plavensky Rural Administrative Okrug of Klimovsky District in Bryansk Oblast; 
May, Starodubsky District, Bryansk Oblast, a settlement in Zapolskokhaleyevichsky Rural Administrative Okrug of Starodubsky District in Bryansk Oblast; 
May, Kaluga Oblast, a village in Kuybyshevsky District of Kaluga Oblast
May, Gorny District, Sakha Republic, a selo in Berdigestyakhsky Rural Okrug of Gorny District in the Sakha Republic
May, Verkhnevilyuysky District, Sakha Republic, a selo in Meyiksky Rural Okrug of Verkhnevilyuysky District in the Sakha Republic